Edward Osborne was a merchant and Lord Mayor of London.

Edward Osborne may also refer to:
Edward Osborne (MP for Sudbury) (1572-1625), MP for Sudbury (UK Parliament constituency), 1621
Edward Osborne (Mayor of Hythe) (1861–1939), Mayor of Hythe
Sir Edward Osborne, 1st Baronet (1596–1647), English politician
Edward B. Osborne (1814–1893), New York politician
F. Edward Osborne (1925–2014), American politician and businessman in Idaho
Edward William Osborne (1845–1926), Episcopal bishop

See also
E. O. Wilson (Edward Osborne Wilson, born 1929), American biologist, researcher and author